Mount Derom is a massif  high standing  south of Mount Eyskens in the Queen Fabiola Mountains. It was discovered on October 7, 1960, by the Belgian Antarctic Expedition under the leadership of Guido Derom, and was named for Derom by the Centre National de Recherches Polaires de Belgique.

References

Mountains of Queen Maud Land
Prince Harald Coast